Colmar is an unincorporated community in Lamoine Township, McDonough County, Illinois, United States. Colmar had a post office, which closed on July 18, 1992.

References

Unincorporated communities in McDonough County, Illinois
Unincorporated communities in Illinois